Cartilage intermediate layer protein 1 is a protein that in humans is encoded by the CILP gene.

Major alterations in the composition of the cartilage extracellular matrix occur in joint disease, such as osteoarthrosis. The synthesis of cartilage intermediate layer protein (CILP), which was identified and purified from human articular cartilage, increases in early osteoarthrosis cartilage.  The C-terminal 460 amino acids of the protein show 90% similarity to the pig ectonucleotide pyrophosphohydrolase NTPPHase; this region is preceded by a furin protease consensus cleavage site. Thus, the CILP gene is thought to encode a protein precursor for 2 different proteins, namely CILP and a homolog of NTPPHase.

References

External links

Further reading